The 2009 NAB Cup is the Australian Football League pre-season competition that was played before the Australian Football League's 2009 Premiership season begins. It culminated with the final on 13 March 2009 played between Geelong and Collingwood, which was won by Geelong. The final was originally scheduled for 14 March 2009 but was moved by the AFL so that the match did not clash with the Sound Relief benefit concert for the Victorian bushfires.

Games

Round 1

Round 2

Round 3

Grand Final

Summary of results

NAB Challenge

See also
 2009 AFL season

Notes

Australian Football League pre-season competition
NAB Cup
NAB Cup